Gamma-sarcoglycan is a protein that in humans is encoded by the SGCG gene. The α to δ-sarcoglycans are expressed predominantly (β) or exclusively (α, γ and δ) in striated muscle. A mutation in any of the sarcoglycan genes may lead to a secondary deficiency of the other sarcoglycan proteins, presumably due to destabilisation of the sarcoglycan complex.  The disease-causing mutations in the α to δ genes cause disruptions within the dystrophin-associated protein (DAP) complex in the muscle cell membrane. The transmembrane components of the DAP complex link the cytoskeleton to the extracellular matrix in adult muscle fibres, and are essential for the preservation of the integrity of the muscle cell membrane.

Function 

Gamma-sarcoglycan is one of several sarcolemmal transmembrane glycoproteins that interact with dystrophin, probably to provide a link between the membrane associated cytoskeleton and the extracellular matrix.  Defects in the protein can lead to early onset autosomal recessive muscular dystrophy, in particular limb-girdle muscular dystrophy, type 2C (LGMD2C).

Structure

Gene
Human SGCG gene maps to chromosome 13 at q12, spans over 100 kb of DNA and includes 8 exons.

Protein
Gamma-sarcoglycan is a type II transmembrane protein and consists of 291 amino acids. It has a 35 amino acid intracellular N-terminal region, a 25 amino acid single transmembrane domain, and a 231 amino acid extra-cellular C-terminus.

Clinical significance
Sarcoglycanopathies are autosomal recessive limb girdle muscular dystrophies (LGMDs) caused by mutations in any of the four sarcoglycan genes: α (LGMD2D), β (LGMD2E), γ (LGMD2C) and δ (LGMD2F). Severe childhood autosomal recessive muscular dystrophy (SCARMD) is a progressive muscle-wasting disorder that segregates with microsatellite markers at γ-sarcoglycan gene. Mutations in the γ-sarcoglycan gene were first described in the Maghreb countries of North Africa, where γ-sarcoglycanopathy has a higher than usual incidence. One common mutation, Δ-521T, which causes a severe phenotype, occurs both in the Maghreb population and in other countries. A Cys283Tyr mutation has been identified in the Gypsy population causing a severe phenotype and a Leu193Ser mutation which causes a mild phenotype.

Interactions 

SGCG has been shown to interact with FLNC.

References

Further reading

External links 
 LOVD mutation database: SGCG